The Mao Gong ding  is a bronze ding tripod vessel from the Western Zhou dynasty  (c. 1045 BCE – 771 BCE), currently at the National Palace Museum in Taipei. The vessel has an inscription of 500 characters arranged in 32 lines, the longest inscription among the ancient Chinese bronze inscriptions. The ding dates from the reign of King Xuan of Zhou, and was presented to him by the Duke Yin of Mao.

Description 
The Mao Gong ding takes its name from the Duke (公 gōng) Yin of Mao, who gifted the ding to the King after being appointed to help run state affairs. The artifact is 53.8 cm high, 47.9 cm wide, and weighs a total of 34.7 kilograms.

The interior surface of the ding is covered in an inscription of 500 characters, the longest such inscription known today. The National Palace Museum summarizes its contents:
"The inscription text bears witness to the 'King Xuan restoration' in Western Zhou history [i.e. revitalization after the ascension of King Xuan, ending the Gonghe interregnum]. The first part of the text consists of King Xuan's instructions to the Duke of Mao. The middle portion recounts how the King, upon taking the throne, fondly recalled how the King Wen of Zhou and King Wu of Zhou had enjoyed the Mandate of Heaven and established the kingdom, as well as the King's vigilance and apprehension over inheriting the Mandate himself. The latter part lists in detail the generous gifts the King had bestowed upon the Duke of Mao. In closing, the Duke of Mao expresses his gratitude to the King, and presents the ding as an expression thereof for future generations."

History 
The Mao Gong ding was excavated in Qishan County, Shaanxi province in 1843, during the Daoguang Emperor's reign. The famous collector Chen Jieqi (1813–1884) acquired it in 1852. He and his studio made precise rubbings of the inscriptions. In the Xuantong era (1909–1911) Duanfang (1861–1911) bought it from the Chen family.

Ye Gongchuo (1881–1968) was presented with the ding by friends bought and presented the tripod to him from the Tianjin Dao Sheng Bank, which had it as a mortgage. During the Second Sino-Japanese War, the Ye family sold it to Chen Yon Ren, a millionaire in Shanghai. In April 1946, Chen Yon Ren donated the tripod to the Kuomintang Shanghai Government through a general in their army. In 1949, Chiang Kai-shek and the Kuomintang moved it to Taiwan, where it remains housed at the National Palace Museum.

Notes

References 
 Chinese Art Treasures, Exhibition Catalogue from the National Palace Museum, Taiwan in USA (1961-2), SKILA, Geneva, 1961
 Tan Danjiong (1906-1996), The Mao Gong Ding (Chinese Text), The National Palace Museum Monthly of Chinese Art volume4 no.4,127-136p 1986, Taipei, Taiwan
 The Bell and Cauldron Inscriptions-A Feast of Chinese Characters: the Origin and Development - Mao Gong Ding, National Palace Museum

See also
 Chinese bronze inscriptions
 Jadeite Cabbage and Meat-shaped Stone

National Palace Museum
Zhou dynasty bronzeware
Dings